Bigelow Peak is a summit in Yosemite National Park, United States.

Bigelow Peak was named for John Bigelow, Jr., a Yosemite National Park official.

References

Mountains of Tuolumne County, California
Mountains of Northern California